Ross Corner is an unincorporated community in Imperial County, California.

The name, bestowed in 1917, honors William Crawford Ross, an early settler who opened a gas station there.

References

Unincorporated communities in Imperial County, California
Unincorporated communities in California